The Men's team sprint at the 2011 UCI Track Cycling World Championships was held on March 23. 18 nations of 3 cyclists each participated in the contest. After the qualifying, the fastest 2 teams raced for gold, and 3rd and 4th teams raced for bronze.

In January 2012, the French team were stripped of their world title, following the nullification of Grégory Baugé's 2011 results after a 12-month backdated ban for drug test infringements.

Results

Qualifying
Qualifying was held at 17:15.

Finals
The finals were held at 21:05.

References

2011 UCI Track Cycling World Championships
UCI Track Cycling World Championships – Men's team sprint